Angiolymphoid hyperplasia with eosinophilia (also known as: "Epithelioid hemangioma," "Histiocytoid hemangioma," "Inflammatory angiomatous nodule," "Intravenous atypical vascular proliferation," "Papular angioplasia," "Inflammatory arteriovenous hemangioma," and "Pseudopyogenic granuloma") usually presents with pink to red-brown, dome-shaped, dermal papules or nodules of the head or neck, especially about the ears and on the scalp.

It, or a similar lesion, has been suggested as a feature of IgG4-related skin disease, which is the name used for skin manifestations of IgG4-related disease.

See also 
 List of cutaneous conditions

References

External links 

Eosinophilic cutaneous conditions
IgG4-related disease